Vicki Harber (born 28 July 1956) is a Canadian rower. She competed in the women's quadruple sculls event at the 1984 Summer Olympics.

References

External links
 

1956 births
Living people
Canadian female rowers
Olympic rowers of Canada
Rowers at the 1984 Summer Olympics
Rowers from Ottawa